Obus Pienaar (born 12 December 1989) is a South African cricketer who plays for the Knights cricket team. He was the leading run-scorer in the 2017–18 Sunfoil 3-Day Cup for South Western Districts, with 909 runs in ten matches. He was also the leading run-scorer in the 2018–19 CSA 3-Day Provincial Cup, with 957 runs in ten matches, and the leading run-scorer for South Western Districts in the 2018–19 CSA Provincial One-Day Challenge, with 505 runs in nine matches.

In September 2019, Pienaar was named in Northern Cape's squad for the 2019–20 CSA Provincial T20 Cup. In June 2021, he was selected to take part in the Minor League Cricket tournament in the United States following the players' draft.

References

External links
 

1989 births
Living people
South African cricketers
Knights cricketers
South Western Districts cricketers
Cricketers from Bloemfontein
20th-century South African people
21st-century South African people